Érdi VSE is a Hungarian football club located in Érd, Hungary. It currently plays in Nemzeti Bajnokság III. The team's colors are green and white.

History
On 16 June 2020, Érd official withdrew from the participation in the Nemzeti Bajnokság II, although they finished first in the 2019-20 Nemzeti Bajnokság III season which was abandoned due to the COVID-19 pandemic. Instead of Érd, Szentlőrinci SE will participate in the 2020-21 Nemzeti Bajnokság II season, while Érd will participate in the 2020-21 Nemzeti Bajnokság III season.

References

External links
Official website

Football clubs in Hungary
Association football clubs established in 1921
1921 establishments in Hungary